The Rupal Valley is a valley located in the Astore District of Gilgit-Baltistan, Pakistan.

Peaks located in the Rupal Valley
Nanga Parbat
Rupal Peak
Shaigiri
Laila Peak (Rupal Valley)

See also
Rupal River
Rupal Glacier
Rupal Peak

References

External links
 Northern Pakistan - highly detailed placemarks in Google Earth

Astore District
Valleys of Gilgit-Baltistan